Mahmood Shah or Shihab-Ud-Din Mahmud was the sultan of the Bahmani Sultanate from 1482 until his death in 1518. His long rule is noted for the disintegration of the sultanate and the creation of the independent Deccan sultanates.

Reign 
Mahmood was born about 1470 the son of Muhammad Shah Lashkari. He ascended the throne at age 12 on 26 March 1482 (Safar 5, 887 AH). The new Regency was formed with the Queen as president and Malik Na'ib, one of the conspirators behind the death of Mahmud Gawan, as regent.

His early reign was characterised by the conflict between the rising power of newcomers, epitomised by  Yusuf Adil Shah, and the traditional Deccani nobles, led by Malik Na'ib.  After a failed attempt to assassinate Yusuf Adil Shah, the sultan retired to Bijapur and left the running of the country in the hands of a viceroy or Malik Na'ib, Nizam-ul-Mulk Malik Hasan Bahri, and his fellow Deccani. The Malik Na'ib himself was assassinated in 1486. An attempt to assassinate the sultan by Deccani in 1487 led to the slaughter of many Deccani and the strengthening of the newcomers' position.

The Sultan's obviously weak position led to increasing unrest amongst the nobles, particularly the powerful regional governors, some of whom, like Fathullah Imad-ul-Mulk quietly assumed the titles of royalty. Others led in open rebellion.  Qasim Barid I led one of the first revolt from Bidar and successfully defeated the army sent by the sultan to rein him in.  Qasim Barid was raised to Barid-ul-mumalik and made prime minister and de facto ruler, while the sultan lived a life of indulgence.  The King's expenditure was so high that he had jewels extracted from the Turquoise throne and used for payment.

On 28 May 1490, Malik Ahmad Nizam Shah I revolted and defeated the Bahmani army led by general Jahangir Khanbuilt. He built a palace, making it the center of the newly created Ahmednagar Sultanate. Yusuf Adil Shah followed suit creating the Adil Shahi dynasty centered at Bijapur, with  Fathullah Imad-ul-Mulk creating the Berar Sultanate within the year. Qasim Barid founded the Bidar Sultanate centered at Bidar in 1492 while Golconda Sultanate became independent under Quli Qutb Shah in 1518 whose capital was at Golconda in modern Hyderabad.

On Qasim Barid's death in 1504, the title of prime minister was passed to his son Amir Barid. The Sultan died on 27 December 1518 (Zil-hij 24, 924 AH) and was succeeded by his son Ahmed.

Sources

References

Sultans
1518 deaths
Indian Muslims
Bahmani Sultans